The 1911 Kansas Jayhawks football team was an American football team that represented the University of Kansas as a member of the Missouri Valley Conference (MVC) during the 1911 college football season. In their first and only season under head coach Ralph W. Sherwin, the Jayhawks compiled a 4–2–2 record (1–1–1 against conference opponents), finished in third place in the MVC, and outscored opponents by a total of 81 to 44. The Jayhawks played their home games at McCook Field in Lawrence, Kansas. Earl Ammons was the team captain.

Schedule

References

Kansas
Kansas Jayhawks football seasons
Kansas Jayhawks football